The 1989 SWAC men's basketball tournament was held March 9–11, 1989, at F. G. Clark Center in Baton Rouge, Louisiana.  Southern defeated , 86–81 in the championship game, to gain an automatic berth to the NCAA tournament. The Jaguars received the #15 seed in the Southeast region.

Bracket and results

References

1988–89 Southwestern Athletic Conference men's basketball season
SWAC men's basketball tournament